Cross River Central Senatorial District in Cross River State covers six local governments which include Abi, Yakurr, Obubra, Ikom, Etung and Boki. The current representative of Cross River Central is Sandy Ojang Onor of the People’s Democratic Party, PDP.

List of senators representing Cross River Central

References 

Politics of Cross River State
Senatorial districts in Nigeria